Astrakhan Airlines was an airline based in Astrakhan, Russia. It operated scheduled and chartered, domestic and international passenger and cargo flights out of Narimanovo Airport, Astrakhan.

History 
Astrakhan Airlines was established in 1994 and was owned by the Board of Directors (65%), the local Concrete Structures Plant (a Gazprom subsidiary) (25%) and employees and investors (10%). In 2005, the airline was shut down.

Services 
Upon closure, Astrakhan Airlines operated scheduled flights to the following destinations: 

Domestic scheduled destinations: Astrakhan and Moscow.
International scheduled destinations: Aktau and Yerevan.

Fleet 
The Astrakhan Airlines fleet consisted of only one Tupolev Tu-134 aircraft.

References 

Defunct airlines of Russia
Airlines disestablished in 2005
Airlines established in 1994
1994 establishments in Russia
Companies based in Astrakhan Oblast